Chris Porter (November 27, 1979) is an American comedian and finalist on season 4 of Last Comic Standing. He has also appeared on The Bob & Tom Show, Comedy Central's Live Tour, and appeared on Live at Gotham in Summer 2006. In 2009, Porter made an appearance on Comedy Central Presents. His 2014 comedy special "Chris Porter: Ugly and Angry" is available for streaming on Amazon Prime, as is the 2019 follow-up, "Man From Kansas".

Porter is from Shawnee, Kansas and currently resides in Los Angeles, California.

External links
 Official website
 Comedy Central profile

1979 births
Living people
People from Shawnee, Kansas
American stand-up comedians
Last Comic Standing contestants
People from Kansas City, Missouri
Comedians from Missouri
21st-century American comedians
Stand Up! Records artists